Following is a list of animal actors. Those listed should have either a substantial number of performances or, in rare cases, a high-profile role.

See also
 Animal training
 List of individual cats
 List of individual dogs

References

 
Actors
Lists of film actors
Lists of films and television series